The Association of the Balkan Athletics Federations, commonly known as Balkan Athletics is the organisation which organises the annual senior Balkan Athletics Championships and Balkan Athletics Indoor Championships, as well as other competitions at junior and youth level on track and field and other surfaces.

Membership 
Balkan Athletics is made up of 22 member federations.

Competitions 
Balkan Athletics runs a number of competitions.

References

External links 
 Balkan Athletics Website
 Balkan Masters Athletics Website

Athletics organizations
Athletics in Europe
Athletics